Malai Murasu is a Tamil language evening daily newspaper in Tamil Nadu, India by Ramachandra Adithyan. The current director is Kannan Adityan.

References

Tamil-language newspapers published in India
Evening newspapers published in India
Mass media in Madurai
Publications with year of establishment missing